Maurice Macaire (November 22, 1881 in Paris, date of death unknown) was a French football player who competed in the 1900 Olympic Games. In Paris he won a silver medal as a member of Club Français club team.

References

External links

1881 births
French footballers
Olympic silver medalists for France
Olympic footballers of France
Footballers at the 1900 Summer Olympics
Year of death missing
Olympic medalists in football
Medalists at the 1900 Summer Olympics
Association football midfielders
Footballers from Paris
Place of death missing